Anzali Lagoon (also Anzali Mordab, Anzali Bay, Pahlavi Mordab, Pahlavi Bay or Anzali Liman) is a coastal liman, or lagoon, in the Caspian Sea near Bandar-e Anzali, in the northern Iranian province of Gilan. The lagoon divides Bandar-e Anzali into two parts, and is home to both the Selke Wildlife Refuge and the Siahkesheem Marsh.

History

Although the lagoon suffers from pollution, it is known as a good place for bird watching. The lagoon's water ranges from fresh near the tributary streams to brackish near the mouth into the harbor and the sea. Studies indicate that in the 19th and early 20th Centuries that the lagoon had a much higher salinity.

The lagoon has decreased in size since the 1930s to less than a quarter of its former extent. However, in the last ten years water salinity has increased both by the rise of the level of the Caspian Sea which has caused greater interchange of waters, and due to greater salt transport in incoming "fresh" water due to increased upstream irrigation.

The lagoon has been listed in Ramsar Convention since 21 December 1975.

Fishery

Prior to 1950 the Anzali Lagoon provided about 70% of the commercial fish taken in Gilan Province, with catches of over 5,000 tons annually.  Commercial fishing was done during the spring and autumn spawning cycles when the kutum, pike-perch and bream, would enter the lagoon from the Caspian. However, a number of factors acted against the continuation of the fishery and by the time commercial fishing ceased in 1960 annual catches were less than 100 tons.

Heavy siltation from increased upstream irrigation had resulted in the shrinkage and shallowing of the lagoon, increased pollution of the source waters and eutrophication due to an increased nutrient load contributed to the destruction of the fishery. More recently the surface of the lagoon has become gradually overgrown with aquatic macrophytes, primarily the non-native water-fern, Azolla filiculoides, and this has caused increased eutrophication, creating large areas of the lagoon where there is insufficient dissolved oxygen for fish to survive.

Geography

Located in an area of 15,000 hectares near the northern port city of Bandar Anzali in Gilan Province, Anzali is one of the few Iranian wetlands which have been registered as an international wetland in the 1975 Ramsar Convention. Wetlands are considered the most biologically diverse of all ecosystems; however, the Anzali Wetland has also been the victim of the authorities neglect, putting it in danger of grave ecological changes.

The use of Anzali Wetland's bank as the city dump and the release of human and industrial waste into the wetland have already put in danger the lives of animal species and at least 78 species of birds living in the area. Besides, some local authorities plan to build a sports field in a peninsula connected to the wetland. This will be the final blow to the wetland, which has so far been prevented only by the serious opposition of environmentalists to the construction of the sports field.

The efforts made in Australia, Canada, the United States and many European countries to protect nature can be considered an epitome of the governments' serious attention to the conservation of natural habitats, which are permanent sources of tourism attraction.

Islands
Among the islands located in the lagoon are Bozorg, Kouchak, and Mianposhteh.

Tributaries
The following rivers and streams flow into the Anzali Lagoon.
Pirbazar
Pasikhan
Shakhraz
Gazrudbar
Massuleh
Palanghvar
Abatar
Khalkai
Morghak
Bahambar
Shaf

References

External links

Landforms of Gilan Province
Wetlands of Iran
Lagoons of Iran
Ramsar sites in Iran
Tourist attractions in Gilan Province